Saxwɛ, also spelled Tsáphɛ, is a Gbe language of Benin.

References

Gbe languages